ADP-ribosylation factor-like protein 4A is a protein that in humans is encoded by the ARL4A gene.

Function 

ADP-ribosylation factor-like 4A is a member of the ADP-ribosylation factor family of GTP-binding proteins. ARL4A is similar to ARL4C and ARL4D and each has a nuclear localization signal and an unusually high guanine nucleotide exchange rate. ARL4A is located in both the nuclear and extranuclear cell compartments. Multiple transcript variants encoding the same protein have been found for this gene.

Interactions 

ARL4A has been shown to interact with Karyopherin alpha 2.

References

Further reading

External links